The Sheriff of Bute was historically the office responsible for enforcing law and order on the Isle of Bute, Scotland and bringing criminals to justice. 

Before the Jacobite uprising of 1745, the office was typically hereditary, eventually shifting to salaried sheriffs by 1748.

The sheriffdom was combined with Dumbarton in 1854 to form the sheriffdom of Dumbarton & Bute. In 1871 it was split and Bute was combined with Renfrew to form the sheriffdom of Renfrew & Bute. The sheriffdom was split again in 1946, when Bute was combined with Ayr to form the sheriffdom of Ayr & Bute.

Sheriffs of Bute

John Stewart 1385
James Stewart 1445-1449
Ninian Stewart
Thomas Boyd, Earl of Arran 1468 
Ninian Stewart 1492

Sheriffs-Depute
William Macleod Bannatyne, 1776–1799 
John James Edmonstone, 1799–1818 
Samuel McCormick, 1818-34
James Ivory, 1834-1838 
Robert Hunter, 1839–1854 

For sheriffs after 1854 see Sheriff of Dumbarton and Bute

See also
 Historical development of Scottish sheriffdoms

References

sheriff